Mount Janus is a bifurcated peak rising to  at the north side of the head of Montigny Glacier in the Bowers Mountains of Antarctica. It was named by the New Zealand Antarctic Place-Names Committee on the proposal of geologist R.A. Cooper, leader of a New Zealand Antarctic Research Programme geological party to the area, 1981–82, after Janus, the deity of portals in Roman mythology, symbolized as having two faces. The topographical feature lies situated on the Pennell Coast, a portion of Antarctica lying between Cape Williams and Cape Adare.

References

Mountains of Victoria Land
Pennell Coast